Venustaconcha ellipsiformis is a species of bivalves belonging to the family Unionidae.

The species is found in Northern America.

References

Unionidae